Bojan Vručina (born 8 November 1984) is a Croatian professional footballer who plays as a forward for Međimurec Dunjkovec-Pretetinec.

Club career
After youth years with Varteks and Podravina Ludbreg, Vručina started his professional career at Slaven Belupo in the second half of the 2003–04 season. In the 2006–07 season, he appeared in 32 of the club's 33 games in the Croatian league, scoring eleven goals. In the summer of 2007, he also appeared in all of the club's four UEFA Cup qualifiers, scoring three goals.

In the second half of the 2007–08 season, Vručina was signed by German Bundesliga side MSV Duisburg on loan until the end of the season. He made his Bundesliga debut on 2 February 2008 as a late substitute in their 3–3 draw against Borussia Dortmund. However, he failed to find his place as a regular at the club and only appeared in eight league games, seven of them as a substitute. Following Duisburg's relegation to the 2. Bundesliga, he returned to Slaven Belupo.

In the summer of 2008, he helped Slaven Belupo reach the first round of the UEFA Cup for the first time in the club's history, scoring five goals in their four qualifiers for the competition. However, they failed to reach the group stage after losing to CSKA Moscow in the first round. Vručina nevertheless continued to perform well for the club in the Croatian league and he was their top goalscorer with 14 goals.

On 28 January 2010, Vručina signed a three-and-a-half-year contract with Hapoel Tel Aviv and was a part of the historic win of the Israeli State Cup and Ligat Ha'Al (the Israeli Premier League)

In August 2010, he signed a one-year contract with Superleague Greece club Panserraikos After playing three official matches with the club, he suffered a knee injury and on 28 September it was announced that he would need a knee surgery that would keep him out of action for about five months.

Vručina and Panserraikos agreed termination of his contract in December 2011 and in March 2012 he joined his former club Slaven Belupo as a free agent.

On 25 June 2019, Vručina signed a contract with Croatian fifth division club Borac Imbriovec. He also had two spells in the Austrian lower leagues.

International career
In 2006, Vručina won five international caps for the Croatian national under-21 team, scoring his only goal in a friendly match against Bosnia and Herzegovina on 1 August 2006.

In late March 2009, he received his first call-up for Croatia's senior national team after being named to their squad for the 2010 FIFA World Cup qualifier against Andorra on 1 April 2009.

References

External links
 
 

1984 births
Living people
Sportspeople from Varaždin
Croatian footballers
Association football forwards
Croatian expatriate footballers
Croatia youth international footballers
Croatia under-21 international footballers
NK Slaven Belupo players
MSV Duisburg players
Hapoel Tel Aviv F.C. players
Panserraikos F.C. players
Kaposvári Rákóczi FC players
KF Shkëndija players
Trikala F.C. players
NK Rudar Velenje players
Shabab Al-Ordon Club players
Croatian Football League players
Bundesliga players
Israeli Premier League players
Super League Greece players
Football League (Greece) players
Nemzeti Bajnokság I players
Macedonian First Football League players
Slovenian PrvaLiga players
Austrian Landesliga players
Austrian 2. Landesliga players
Expatriate footballers in Germany
Expatriate footballers in Israel
Expatriate footballers in Greece
Expatriate footballers in Hungary
Expatriate footballers in North Macedonia
Expatriate footballers in Slovenia
Expatriate footballers in Jordan
Expatriate footballers in Austria
Croatian expatriate sportspeople in Germany
Croatian expatriate sportspeople in Israel
Croatian expatriate sportspeople in Greece
Croatian expatriate sportspeople in Hungary
Croatian expatriate sportspeople in North Macedonia
Croatian expatriate sportspeople in Slovenia
Croatian expatriate sportspeople in Austria